is a temple of the Shingon Ritsu school with an historic Japanese garden located in Kizugawa, Kyoto Prefecture, Japan. It is one of the few remaining examples of a Paradise Garden of the early Heian period. The three-storied pagoda, the main hall, the group of nine sitting Amida Nyorai statues and the group of Four Heavenly Kings are all designated as National Treasures. The temple is heavily influenced by Pure Land thought.

The Temple
The Jōruri-ji Temple was founded in 1047 by the priest Gimyō Shōnin. Similar to temples of Pure Land Buddhism, it is laid out around a large pond, which represents the ocean that separates birth and death. In the center of the pond is an island symbolizing earth, connected to the shore by a stone slab bridge. On the west side of the pond is the Amida Hall or Paradise Hall, which symbolizes the Western Paradise of Amida Nyorai. To the east of the lake is a three-story pagoda which represents the Eastern Paradise of Yakushi Nyorai, the Buddha of healing.  Worshipers could stand on the east side of the pond and face west toward the Paradise Hall.

The Paradise Hall contains nine statues of the Amida Buddha, each one symbolizing one of the nine stages of Nirvana. It was constructed in 1107 and moved to its present location in 1157.   The temple also has a pagoda, moved to its present site from Kyoto in 1178.

The garden
The pond was dug in 1150 by priests from Kōfuku-ji. On either side of the pond are stone lanterns dating to 1366, which are classified as Important Cultural Properties by the Japanese government. Beginning in 1976 the garden was restored to its original form by the landscape architect Mori Osamu.

See also
List of National Treasures of Japan (temples)
List of National Treasures of Japan (sculptures)
List of Special Places of Scenic Beauty, Special Historic Sites and Special Natural Monuments
List of Cultural Properties of Japan - sculptures (Kyōto)
List of Historic Sites of Japan (Kyōto)

Sources and Citations

Bibliography
David and Michiko Young, The Art of the Japanese Garden, Tuttle Publishing, Singapore, 2005.

Pure Land Buddhism
Gardens in Japan
Gardens in Kyoto Prefecture
Buddhist temples in Kyoto Prefecture
Shingon Ritsu temples
National Treasures of Japan
Special Places of Scenic Beauty
Important Cultural Properties of Japan
Historic Sites of Japan